Qalat-e Rostam (also Romanized as Qalāt-e Rostam) is a village in Karian Rural District, in the Central District of Minab County, Hormozgan Province, Iran. At the 2006 census, its population was 40, in 8 families.

References 

Populated places in Minab County